Eileen Burbidge MBE (born June 1971) is an American venture capitalist based in London, UK. She is a founding partner of Passion Capital, an early-stage venture capital firm that has invested in Monzo, Go Cardless and Lulu, a private social network for single women.

Career 
Burbidge previously worked in marketing roles at Apple and Sun Microsystems. In 2004 she moved from the United States to London to pursue a career with Skype. After working at Skype, Burbidge launched Passion Capital, an early-stage London venture capital firm, with Stefan Glaenzer in 2008.

In 2015, Burbidge was appointed Member of the Order of the British Empire for services to entrepreneurship in the New Year honours list.

In July 2015, she was appointed as the British Treasury's "special envoy" for fintech.

In November 2018, Burbidge was named to the Financial Times list of the 'Top 100 minority ethnic leaders in technology'.

In January 2019, she joined the board of Currys plc as a non-executive director.

In October 2020, Burbidge was added to Computer Weeklys Most Influential Women in UK Tech Hall of Fame. This list is published annually to recognise women who have had a long career in the tech sector and/or made a lasting contribution to the sector.

Personal life
Burbidge has also used the names Eileen Tso and Eileen Broch, her maiden name and her name from a previous marriage, respectively.

References

1971 births
Living people
American venture capitalists
British venture capitalists
Members of the Order of the British Empire